Mario Estanislao Killer Díez (born 15 August 1951) is an Argentine retired footballer. He played as defender in different clubs in Argentina and Spain and was part of the national team at the 1975 Copa América.

References

1951 births
Living people
Footballers from Rosario, Santa Fe
Argentine footballers
Association football defenders
Argentine Primera División players
La Liga players
Rosario Central footballers
Club Atlético Independiente footballers
Newell's Old Boys footballers
Club Atlético Belgrano footballers
Sporting de Gijón players
Expatriate footballers in Spain
Argentine expatriate footballers
Real Betis players